George Tanner may refer to:

George Tanner (Australian footballer) (1914–1982), Australian rules footballer
George Tanner (English footballer) (born 1999), English footballer for Bristol City